This is a list of notable events in music that took place in the year 2004.

Specific locations
2004 in British music
2004 in Irish music
2004 in Norwegian music
2004 in South Korean Music

Specific genres
2004 in classical music
2004 in country music
2004 in heavy metal music
2004 in hip hop music
2004 in Latin music
2004 in jazz

Events

January–February
January 1
The Vienna New Year's Concert is conducted by Riccardo Muti.
Kurt Nilsen wins World Idol.
January 3 – Britney Spears marries Jason Allen Alexander, a childhood friend, in Las Vegas. The marriage is annulled 55 hours later. 
January 15 – Rapper Mystikal is sentenced to six years in prison for sexual battery.
January 16–February 1 – The Big Day Out festival takes place in Australia and New Zealand, headlined by Metallica. A Perfect Circle is originally named in the lineup but later withdraw, with Fear Factory appearing as a mystery artist in place of all of A Perfect Circle's scheduled slots.
February 1
Janet Jackson and Justin Timberlake perform onstage at Super Bowl XXXVIII. The performance concludes with Jackson's right breast being exposed to the audience. The phrase "wardrobe malfunction" is coined during the ensuing controversy.
Daron Hagen is appointed President of the Lotte Lehmann Foundation in New York City.
February 8 – The 46th Annual Grammy Awards are held at the Staples Center in Los Angeles, California. Outkast's Speakerboxxx/The Love Below becomes the first rap album to win Album of the Year. Beyoncé wins five awards. Coldplay's "Clocks" wins Record of the Year, while Luther Vandross' "Dance with My Father" wins Song of the Year. Evanescence win Best New Artist.
February 9 – Blink-182 release single "I Miss You" from the album Blink-182. The song will reach number one on the Billboard Modern Rock chart.
February 10 – Paulina Rubio releases her seventh studio "Pau-Latina" under Universal Music Mexico. The album charted at #1 on the Billboard Latin Pop Albums and at #105 on the Billboard 200. The album also got certified 2× Platinum (Latin) by the RIAA.
February 13 – Elton John begins The Red Piano concert residency at The Colosseum at Caesars Palace in Las Vegas. Originally scheduled for 75 performances, it would run for 248 shows over five years, including twenty-four tour dates in Europe. 
February 17
BRIT Awards are held in London. The Darkness, Dido, Busted, Justin Timberlake and KRS-One are among the winners.
Smashing Pumpkins frontman Billy Corgan posts a bitter message on his personal blog calling D'arcy Wretzky a "mean spirited drug addict" and blaming James Iha for the breakup of the band.

March–April
March 2 – Britney Spears embarks on The Onyx Hotel Tour, her first tour in 2 years to support her fourth studio album, In The Zone.
March 9 – Westlife member Brian McFadden leaves the band.
March 10 – George Michael announces that Patience will be his last commercially released record. Future releases will be available from his web site in return for donations to his favourite charities.
March 13 – Luciano Pavarotti gives his last performance in an opera, in Tosca at the New York Metropolitan Opera.
March 23 – Usher releases his Confessions album selling 1.1 million copies its first week, making him the first R&B artist to ever accomplish that. The album would be the top seller of the year with four number one singles.
April 6
A previously unreleased Johnny Cash album called My Mother's Hymn Book is released less than a year after his death on September 12, 2003.
Modest Mouse, an American indie rock band releases Good News for People Who Love Bad News.
April 20 – Fear Factory returns after their 2002 breakup with the new album Archetype.
April 26
Deborah Voigt, sacked by Covent Garden for being too fat for an opera role, makes her recital debut to a rapturous reception at Carnegie Hall.
Dream Theater performs at the Nippon Budokan Hall in Tokyo, Japan.

May–June
May 1-2 – The annual Coachella Valley Music and Arts Festival takes place in California. Headlined by Radiohead and The Cure, the lineup also features Pixies, The Flaming Lips, Belle and Sebastian, Muse, MF Doom, Basement Jaxx, Death Cab for Cutie, Black Rebel Motorcycle Club, Kraftwerk and Kool Keith.
May 10 
Blender magazine's May issue includes a "50 Worst Songs Ever!" list. "We Built This City," by Starship, is rated worst.
Peter Tägtgren replaces Mikael Åkerfeldt In Bloodbath.
Keane release Hopes and Fears which becomes the 16th best selling album of the millennium in the UK. It went 8× platinum and was nominated for the Mercury Prize and the BRIT award for best album.
May 12–15 – The 49th Eurovision Song Contest, held at Abdi İpekçi Arena in Istanbul, Turkey, is won by Ukrainian singer Ruslana with the song "Wild Dances". It is the first contest to take place as a multi-date event.
May 18-23 – The European Festival of Youth Choirs (EJCF) is held in Basel.
May 24 – Madonna starts The Re-Invention Tour in 20 cities with a total of 56 shows and making it the most successful concert tour of the year with a gross of $124.5 million.
May 25
Phish announces that after 21 years they will break up following the Summer 2004 Tour.
Skinny Puppy releases their first studio album since disbanding in 1996, called The Greater Wrong of the Right.
May 26 – Fantasia Barrino wins the third season of American Idol, defeating Diana DeGarmo.
May 28 – June 6 – The Rock in Rio concert festival is staged in Lisbon, Portugal under the name Rock in Rio Lisboa. Paul McCartney, Peter Gabriel, Foo Fighters, Metallica, Britney Spears and Sting headline each of the six days. 
June 4
Karl Jenkins signs a 10-year recording deal with EMI.
Creed dissolved. Guitarist Mark Tremonti, Drummer Scott Phillips and Brian Marshall (ex Bassist of Creed) were working on side project Alter Bridge along with Myles Kennedy of The Mayfield Four Their first album is One Day Remains, which was scheduled to be released on August 10.
June 5-6 – The annual Download Festival takes place at Donington Park in Leicestershire, England, with Linkin Park and Metallica headlining the main stage. Pennywise and HIM headline the Snickers "Game On" stage, while the Barfly stage is headlined by Peaches and SuicideGirls.
June 7 – The Killers released their first album Hot Fuss.
June 8 – Velvet Revolver released their first album Contraband.
June 10 – Ray Charles dies at the age of 73 from acute liver disease.
June 11 – The Van Halen Summer Tour 2004 kicks off in Greensboro, North Carolina, marking the return of Sammy Hagar on vocals for the first time since his acrimonious departure from the band in 1996.
June 12 – The Los Angeles, California radio station KROQ-FM airs the 12th Annual KROQ Weenie Roast show with Bad Religion, Beastie Boys, Cypress Hill, The Hives, Hoobastank, The Killers, Modest Mouse, New Found Glory, Story of the Year, The Strokes, Velvet Revolver, Yeah Yeah Yeahs and Yellowcard.
June 22 – 14th annual Lollapalooza festival, scheduled for July 17, is cancelled. Organizers cite "poor ticket sales". (See: Lollapalooza 2004 lineup.)
June 23 – UK DJ Tony Blackburn is suspended by radio station Classic Gold Digital for playing songs by Cliff Richard, against station policy.
June 25
 Eric Clapton sells his famous guitar "Blackie" at a Christie's auction, raising $959,000 to benefit the Crossroads drug rehabilitation center that he founded in 1998.
 While in Scheeßel, Germany for his A Reality tour, David Bowie suffers a heart attack onstage and is subsequently rushed to the emergency room for an angioplasty. The incident brings an abrupt end to the tour and prompts Bowie to move away from both musicianship and public life in the following years, with his next album coming out nearly nine years later.

July–August
July 10 – Ex-S Club star Rachel Stevens sets a world record for completing the fastest promotional circuit in just 24 hours- including a run for the charity Sport Relief. American Idol winner Fantasia becomes the first artist in history to debut at number-one on the Hot 100 with a first record.
July 11 – McFly debut at #1 on the UK album charts with Room On The 3rd Floor. They break the record set by The Beatles as the youngest group ever to debut at #1 on the album charts.
July 20 – Van Halen releases The Best of Both Worlds, a 36-song compilation album featuring three new recordings with Sammy Hagar on vocals.
July 24 – The Robert Smith organized Curiosa Festival kicks off with a concert in West Palm Beach, Florida. Performing along with The Cure are Interpol, The Rapture, Mogwai, Cursive,  Muse, Head Automatica, Thursday, Scarling., The Cooper Temple Clause, and Melissa Auf der Maur.
July 24–25 – The Splendour in the Grass music festival is held in Byron Bay, Australia, headlined by PJ Harvey & Jurassic 5.
July 25 – The Doobie Brothers record and perform Live at Wolf Trap at Wolf Trap National Park for the Performing Arts in Vienna, Virginia.  The live album was released two months later, on October 26.
July 31
Simon & Garfunkel perform a free concert in front of the Colosseum in Rome for an audience of 600,000 people.
Dispatch performs their last live show at the DCR Hatchshell in Boston, Massachusetts.
August 8 – Dave Matthews Band's tour bus dumps 800 lb (360 kg) of human feces from a Chicago bridge, intending to unload it in the river, but it lands on an architecture tour boat. The bus driver and the band are sued by the state of Illinois.
August 15 – Phish performs their final concert at a two-day festival in Coventry, Vermont.
August 17 – Moments in Grace release their debut studio album Moonlight Survived.
August 23 – The Prodigy release their much anticipated and postponed first full-length album Always Outnumbered Never Outgunned, 7 years after 1997's The Fat Of The Land.

September–October
September 7 – Senses Fail release their debut studio album Let It Enfold You
September 18 – Britney Spears marries Kevin Federline.
September 20 – Green Day release their seventh studio album American Idiot, making a comeback for the band, following disappointing sales of their 2000 album Warning. American Idiot eventually receives the award for Best Rock Album at the 47th Grammy Awards on February 13, 2005.
September 26 – Avril Lavigne begins her Bonez Tour.
September 28
Brian Wilson releases Brian Wilson Presents Smile, the first official interpretation of the Smile sessions since their shelving in 1967.
On the same day, young Filipino singer Christian Bautista unveiled his first self-titled debut album.
October – Jazz at Lincoln Center performance venue opens in New York City.
October 2 – Billy Joel marries for the third time, to the food critic and chef Katie Lee.
October 11
The original lineup of Duran Duran release their new album Astronaut, which is preceded by the single "(Reach Up For The) Sunrise".
Melissa Etheridge undergoes surgery for breast cancer.
October 23 – Ashlee Simpson is accused of lip synching after an abortive live performance on the television show Saturday Night Live.
October 25 – Indian singer Hariharan is awarded the Swaralaya Kairali Yesudas Award for his outstanding contribution to Indian film music.

November–December
November 4 – Three members of the band RAM, who all lived in a neighborhood known for its support of the recently deposed former President Jean-Bertrand Aristide, are detained by Haitian police during a concert performance in Port-au-Prince; no charges are ever filed or official explanation for the detentions given.
November 9 – Britney Spears releases her first compilation album titled Greatest Hits: My Prerogative.
November 11 – Eric Clapton receives a CBE at Buckingham Palace.
November 12 – Eminem's fourth major studio album, Encore is released four days before schedule to combat Internet bootleggers. The album sells 710,000 copies in only three days and becomes Eminem's third consecutive album to debut at #1 on the Billboard charts.
November 16 – Destiny's Child released their fourth and final studio album Destiny Fulfilled by Columbia Records in North America.
November 17 – Within Temptation release the single "Stand My Ground".
November 21 – Casey Donovan is crowned winner of the second season of Australian Idol. Anthony Callea was named runner-up.
November 24 – Brian & Eric Hoffman leave Deicide after a royalties dispute.
November 30 – Jay-Z and Linkin Park's album "Collision Course" debuts at number #01 in the Billboard 200, later becoming the best-selling CD/DVD of that year.
December 7 – Lindsay Lohan releases her début album, Speak.
December 8 – Dimebag Darrell is murdered on stage while performing in Columbus, Ohio, by a deranged fan, who shoots the guitarist three times in the head with a 9mm Beretta handgun.  The gunman kills three other people and wounds a further three before being shot dead by police. 
December 11 – Steve Brookstein is crowned winner of the first series of The X Factor. G4 are named the runner-ups, while Tabby Callaghan and Rowetta Satchell finish in third and fourth place respectively.
December 11–12 – The Los Angeles, California radio station KROQ-FM airs the 15th Annual of the Acoustic Christmas with Chevelle, Franz Ferdinand, Good Charlotte, Green Day, Hoobastank, Incubus, Interpol, Jimmy Eat World, Keane, The Killers, Modest Mouse, Muse, The Music, My Chemical Romance, Papa Roach, Snow Patrol, Social Distortion, Sum 41, Taking Back Sunday, The Shins, The Used, and Velvet Revolver.
December 14 – Clint Lowery leaves Sevendust due to fights with band about gaining control of the band and doubts of the band's future after being released from their label TVT Records.

Bands formed
See Musical groups established in 2004

Bands on hiatus
Spineshank (reformed in 2008)
Timo Rautiainen & Trio Niskalaukaus (disbanded in 2006)
Matchbox Twenty (reformed in 2007)

Bands disbanded
See Musical groups disestablished in 2004

Bands re-formed
 Megadeth
 Restless Heart
 Destiny's Child
 Vaya Con Dios
 The Shadows (till 2015)
 New York Dolls

Albums released

January–March

April–June

July–September

October–December

Unknown release dates
3rd Strike – 3 Feet Smaller
5 Stories EP – Manchester Orchestra
9Live – Angie Aparo
Bombs Below – Living Things
Crwth – Cass Meurig (first CD release of crwth music)
Field Rexx – Blitzen Trapper
ForThemAsses – OPM 
Gathering Speed – Big Big Train
Get Saved – Pilot to Gunner 
Golden (compilation) – Failure
Guerilla Disco – Quarashi
Leaving Town Tonight (EP) – Hit the Lights
Life Story (compilation) – The Shadows
Negatives 2 – Phantom Planet
Oceanic Remixes/Reinterpretations – Isis 
The Pink Spiders Are Taking Over! – The Pink Spiders
Point of Origin – There for Tomorrow
The Red Jumpsuit Apparatus – The Red Jumpsuit Apparatus
Safely From the City – Locksley
Set Your Goals (Demo EP) – Set Your Goals
Sherwood (EP) – Sherwood
Smoking Weed in the President's Face – Hockey
Tripped Into Divine – Dexter Freebish
Watching the Snow – Michael Franks (United States release)
We (Don't) Care – The Management (MGMT)
Welcome to Woody Creek – Nitty Gritty Dirt Band

Popular songs

Top 10 selling albums of the year in the US
 Confessions – Usher ~ 7,979,000
 Feels like Home – Norah Jones ~ 3,843,000
 Encore – Eminem ~ 3,517,000
 When the Sun Goes Down – Kenny Chesney ~ 3,072,000
 Under My Skin – Avril Lavigne ~ 2,970,000
 Live Like You Were Dying – Tim McGraw ~ 2,787,000
 Songs About Jane – Maroon 5 ~ 2,708,000
 Fallen – Evanescence ~ 2,614,000
 Autobiography – Ashlee Simpson ~ 2,577,000
 Now That's What I Call Music! 16 – Various ~ 2,560,000

Top 15 selling albums of the year globally
 Confessions – Usher
 Feels Like Home – Norah Jones
 Encore – Eminem
 How to Dismantle an Atomic Bomb – U2
 Under My Skin – Avril Lavigne
 Love. Angel. Music. Baby. – Gwen Stefani
 Greatest Hits – Robbie Williams
 Greatest Hits – Shania Twain
 Destiny Fulfilled – Destiny's Child
 Greatest Hits – Guns N' Roses
 Songs About Jane – Maroon 5
 American Idiot – Green Day
 Elephunk – The Black Eyed Peas
 Greatest Hits: My Prerogative – Britney Spears
 Anastacia – Anastacia

Classical music
Michel van der Aa – Second self
Louis Andriessen – Racconto dall'Inferno
Cornelis de Bondt – Madame Daufine
Elliott Carter – Réflexions
George Crumb – Winds of Destiny for soprano, percussion quartet and piano
Mario Davidovsky – Sefarad: Four Spanish-Ladino Folkscenes, baritone voice, flute (piccolo, alto flute), clarinet (bass clarinet), percussion, violin and cello
Joël-François Durand – Ombre/Miroir for flute and 14 instruments
Ross Edwards – Concerto for Guitar and Strings
Ivan Fedele – Odos
Lorenzo Ferrero – Guarini, the Master for violin and strings
Philip Glass – Symphony No. 7 Toltec
Georg Friedrich Haas – Haiku
Hans Werner Henze – Sebastian im Traum
Alun Hoddinott – Trombone Concerto
York Höller – Ex Tempore
Guus Janssen
Memory Protect Extended
Wankeling
Karl Jenkins – In These Stones Horizons Sing
Jan Klusák – Axis Temporum
Rolands Kronlaks – Paion
Hanna Kulenty – Run
Theo Loevendie – De 5 Driften
Frederik Magle – Souffle le vent, 1st symphonic poem from the suite Cantabile.
Roderik de Man – Mensa Sa
Peter Maxwell Davies
Naxos Quartet No. 4 Children's Games
Naxos Quartet No. 5
Marijn Simons
Symphony No 1, Opus 26
String Quartet No. 3, Opus 27
Dobrinka Tabakova
Concerto for Viola and Strings 
Schubert Arpeggione, arrangement for string orchestra
Suite in Old Style for viola, strings and harpsichord
Whispered Lullaby for viola and piano

Opera
Thomas Adès – The Tempest
Harrison Birtwistle – The Io Passion
William Bolcom – A Wedding

Jazz

Musical theater
Assassins – Broadway production opened at Studio 54 and ran for 101 performances
Bombay Dreams – Broadway production opened at The Broadway Theatre and ran for 284 performances
Fiddler On The Roof – Broadway revival
The Woman in White, music by Andrew Lloyd Webber, lyrics by David Zippel and book by Charlotte Jones, freely adapted from the novel by Wilkie Collins – London production opened on September 15 at the Palace Theatre, London.
People Are Wrong! – Off-Broadway production

Musical films
Alt for Egil, starring Kristoffer Joner
Beyond the Sea, starring Kevin Spacey as Bobby Darin
Bride and Prejudice, starring Aishwarya Rai
De-Lovely released June 13, starring Kevin Kline as Cole Porter and Ashley Judd
Home on the Range, a Disney animated feature
Ray, starring Jamie Foxx as Ray Charles
 Red Riding Hood
Pixel Perfect, a Disney Channel Original Movie that is also a musical.
The Phantom of the Opera, starring Emmy Rossum as Christine and Gerard Butler as the Phantom
Metallica: Some Kind of Monster
Where's Firuze?, starring Haluk Bilginer and Demet Akbağ

Births
January 4 – Alexa Curtis,  Australian singer, Winner of The Voice Kids Australia, Coach was Delta Goodrem
 January 10 – Kaitlyn Maher,  American child singer and actress
 January 15 – Grace VanderWaal, American musician, singer/songwriter, ukulele player
June 4  – Mackenzie Ziegler,  American dancer, singer, actress and model
 August 31 – Jang Won-young, South Korean singer

Deaths

January–February
January 3 – Ronald Smith, 82, British pianist
January 6 – Jimmy Hassell, 62, Guitarist/co-lead singer in The First Edition from 1972 to 1976
January 12 – Randy VanWarmer, 48, songwriter and guitarist
January 15 – Terje Bakken, 25, also known as Valfar, lead singer and founder of Norwegian black/folk metal band Windir (died of hypothermia in a blizzard)
January 16 – John Siomos, 56, drummer
January 17
Czeslaw Niemen, 65, Polish rock singer
Tom Rowe, 53, musician
January 22
Billy May, 87, US big band & pop music arranger
Ann Miller, 80, actress, singer and dancer
January 30 – Julius Dixson, 90, songwriter and record company executive 
February 3 – Cornelius Bumpus, 58, musician (The Doobie Brothers, Steely Dan)
February 6 – Jørgen Jersild, 90, Danish composer and music educator
February 8 – Cem Karaca, 58, Turkish singer and composer
February 16 – Doris Troy, 67, R&B singer
February 21
Les Gray, 57, English singer (Mud)
Bart Howard, 88, composer and pianist
February 23
Don Cornell, 84, US singer
Alvino Rey, 95, US bandleader and guitarist
February 24 – A.C. Reed, 77, blues saxophonist

March–April
March 4 – John McGeoch, 48, British guitarist with Magazine, Siouxsie and the Banshees and PiL
March 6 – Peggy DeCastro, 82, US singer born in the Dominican Republic, eldest of the DeCastro Sisters
March 9 – Rust Epique, 36, guitarist (Crazy Town)
March 10 – Dave Schulthise, 47, punk bassist (The Dead Milkmen)
March 11 – Edmund Sylvers, 47, lead singer of The Sylvers
March 13 – Vilayat Khan, 75, sitar player
March 15 – Eva Likova, 84, operatic soprano
March 16 – Vilém Tauský, 93, Czech conductor and composer
March 18
Vytas Brenner, 57, musician, keyboardist and composer
Erna Spoorenberg, 78, Dutch operatic soprano
March 21 – Johnny Bristol, 65, singer, songwriter and record producer
March 26 – Jan Berry, 62, US singer of Jan and Dean
March 30 – Timi Yuro, 63, soul and R&B singer and songwriter
April 1 – Paul Atkinson, 58, guitarist for The Zombies
April 3 – Gabriella Ferri, 62, Italian singer
April 6 – Niki Sullivan, 66, guitarist for The Crickets
April 9 – Harry Babbitt, 90, US singer with Kay Kyser & his Orchestra
April 10 – Jacek Kaczmarski, 47, Polish poet and singer, the bard of Solidarity
April 15
Ray Condo, 53, Canadian rockabilly musician
Hans Gmür, 77, Swiss theatre author, director, composer and producer

May–June
May 1 – Felix Haug, 52, Swiss pop musician (Double)
May 5 
 Coxsone Dodd, 72, Jamaican record producer
 Ritsuko Okazaki, 44, Japanese songwriter 
May 6 – Barney Kessel, 80, jazz guitarist
May 11 – John Whitehead, 55, R&B artist (shot dead)
May 12 – John LaPorta, 84, Jazz clarinetist, composer and educator
May 17 
Gunnar Graps, 52, Estonian singer (Magnetic Band and Gunnar Graps Group) 
Elvin Jones, 76, Jazz Drummer, notably with the John Coltrane Quartet of the 1960s
May 19 – Arnold Moore, 90, blues artist
May 23 – Gundars Mauševics, 29, Latvian guitarist of Brainstorm
May 31 – Robert Quine, 61, guitarist
June 2 – Billboard, 25, rapper, The Game's best friend
June 4 – Irene Manning, 91, US actress, singer and dancer
June 6 – Iona Brown, 63, conductor and violinist
June 7 – Quorthon, 38, Swedish multi-instrumentalist, founder and songwriter of Bathory
June 10 – Ray Charles, 73, US singer and pianist
June 15 – James F. Arnold, 72, first tenor with the Four Lads
June 17 – Jackie Paris, 77, US jazz singer
June 27 – Sis Cunningham, 95, folk musician

July–August
July 6 – Syreeta Wright, 57, singer (congestive heart failure, a side effect of cancer treatment)
July 13
Arthur Kane, 55, bassist (New York Dolls)
Carlos Kleiber, 74, conductor
July 21 – Jerry Goldsmith, 75, US composer, Academy Award winner
July 22
Illinois Jacquet, 81, US jazz saxophonist
Sacha Distel, 71, French singer
August 2 – Don Tosti, 81, American composer 
August 6
Rick James, 56, US funk singer
Argentino Ledesma, 75, Argentinian singer
Tony Mottola, 86, US Guitarist
August 9 – David Raksin, 92, US composer
August 15 – William Herbert York, 85, bassist for Drifting Cowboys
August 17 – Bernard Odum, 72, bass player for James Brown
August 18 – Elmer Bernstein, 82, US composer
August 20 – María Antonieta Pons, 82, Cuban Rumbera
August 26 – Laura Branigan, 52, US singer (brain aneurysm)
August 31 – Carl Wayne, 61, vocalist (The Move)

September–October
September 2
Michael Connor, 54, American country rock keyboardist (Pure Prairie League)
Billy Davis
September 11 – Juraj Beneš, 64, Slovak composer
September 12
John Buller, 77, British composer
Kenny Buttrey, 59, Nashville session drummer
Fred Ebb, 72, US lyricist
September 15 – Johnny Ramone, 55, US guitarist and founding member of The Ramones (prostate cancer)
September 16 – Izora Armstead, 62, member of The Weather Girls
September 29 – Heinz Wallberg, 81, German conductor
September 30 – Jacques Levy, 69, songwriter and theatre director
October 1 – Bruce Palmer, 58, bassist of Buffalo Springfield
October 7 – Miki Matsubara, 44, Japanese composer and singer 
October 19 – Greg Shaw, 55, music historian and record label owner
October 25 – John Peel, 65, British DJ and broadcaster (heart attack)
October 28 – Gil Melle, 72, film and television music composer

November–December
November 1
Mac Dre, 34, Bay Area rapper (highway shooting)
Terry Knight, 61, lead singer of Terry Knight and the Pack and manager-producer of Grand Funk Railroad(stabbed in domestic dispute)
November 12 – Usko Meriläinen, 74, Finnish composer
November 13
John Balance, 42, British musician from Coil
Ol' Dirty Bastard, 35, African American rapper (drug overdose)
Carlo Rustichelli, 87, Italian film composer
November 14 – Michel Colombier, 65, composer
November 18 – Cy Coleman, 75, US composer
November 19 – Terry Melcher, 62, musician and producer
December 2 – Kevin Coyne, 60, singer, composer and guitarist
December 5 – Bill Maybray, 60, lead singer of The Jaggerz (cancer) 
December 8 – Dimebag Darrell, 38, former Pantera guitarist (shot to death in Ohio)
December 13 – Alex Soria, 39, guitarist for The Nils (suicide)
December 14 – Sidonie Goossens, 105, harpist
December 16 -Freddie Perren, 61, songwriter, producer, arranger and conductor
December 19 – Renata Tebaldi, 82, operatic soprano
December 20 – Son Seals, 62, blues musician
December 26 – Sigurd Køhn, 45, Norwegian jazz saxophonist (tsunami)
December 27 – Hank Garland, 74, Nashville session guitarist
December 30 – Artie Shaw, 94, Swing Era Clarinetist and Bandleader

Awards
The following artists were inducted into the Rock and Roll Hall of Fame: Jackson Browne, The Dells, George Harrison, Prince, Bob Seger, Traffic, Z Z Top

ARIA Music Awards
ARIA Music Awards of 2004

BRIT Awards
2004 BRIT Awards

Country Music Association Awards
 2004 Country Music Association Awards

Eurovision Song Contest
Eurovision Song Contest 2004
Junior Eurovision Song Contest 2004

Grammy Awards
Grammy Awards of 2004

Juno Awards
Juno Awards of 2004

MTV Video Music Awards
2004 MTV Video Music Awards

Charts

Triple J Hottest 100
Triple J Hottest 100, 2004

See also
 2004 in music (UK)
 Record labels established in 2004

References

External links
For a more detailed list of hits or albums by month, see:
 KATS-FM
 New Rock 94.7 The Zone – WZZN-FM – Chicago
 Pause & Play's On The CD Front
 VH1
 MTV
 Rolling Stone

 
2004-related lists
Music-related lists
Music by year